The abstinence theory of interest asserts that the money used for lending purposes is the money not used for consumption – which means, earning interest by abstaining from spending makes the funds possible and available for borrowers.

The originator of the theory is Nassau William Senior.

Notes

Interest